Terrible (formerly Terrible Records) is a Los Angeles-based record label and artist management company founded by Chris Taylor and Ethan Silverman in 2009. Originally based in Brooklyn, New York, the label operated as a joint venture imprint of XL Recordings and Beggars Group respectively. It was distributed by Universal Music Group. After a short stint as a imprint with Interscope, Terrible records is now distributed Independently via Stem Distribution. Over the past 4 years Ethan Silverman's focus shifted toward management. His current management roster includes Claud, Sir Chloe, Petey, The Hellp, Exum, The Slaps, Mila Degray, Kali, Liam Benzvi and more.

The label was created in an attempt to spend more time working with and giving exposure to upcoming artists through the release of a number of 7" and 10" EPs. Taylor also released his own solo material (under the moniker CANT) on the label. His solo debut album, Dreams Come True was released on September 13, 2011, via Terrible.

Roster

Discography
 TR001: Arthur Russell/CANT – "Come to Life"/"Ghosts" (2009)
 TR002: Acrylics – All of the Fire (2009)
 TR003: Class Actress – Journal of Ardency (2010)
 TR004: Twin Shadow/Violens – "Number Four" (2010)
 TR005: Twin Shadow – Forget (2010)
 TR006: Blood Orange – "Blood Orange" (2011)
 TR007: Chairlift – "Amanaemonesia" (2011)
 TR008: CANT – Dreams Come True (2011)
 TR009: Kindness – "Cyan" (2011)
 TR010: Horrid Red – Celestial Joy (2011)
 TR011: Kindness – World, You Need a Change of Mind (2011)
 TR012: Kirin J. Callinan – "WIIW/Thighs" (2012)
 TR013: Solange – "Losing You" (2012) 
 TR014: Horrid Red – Nightly Wreaths (2012)
 TR015: Solange – True (2013)
 TR016: Empress Of – Systems (2013)
 TR017: Diamond Terrifier – The Subtle Body Wears a Shadow (2013)
 TR018: Forces – Forces (2013) 
 TR019: Kirin J. Callinan – Embracism (2013)
 TR021: Regal Degal – Pyramid Bricks (2014)
 TR022: Ramona Lisa – Arcadia (2014)
 TR024: Le1f – Hey (2014) 
 TR026: Porches – "Ronald Paris House" (2014)
 TR028: Sick Feeling – Suburban Myth (2015)
 TR031: Regal Degal – Not Now (2015)
Petey - Lean Into Life (2021)

References

External links
 Official website

Record labels established in 2009
Indie rock record labels
American independent record labels
2009 establishments in New York City